Superman  is a 1988 American animated Saturday morning television series produced by Ruby-Spears Enterprises for Warner Bros. Television that aired on CBS featuring the DC Comics superhero of the same name (coinciding with the character's 50th anniversary, along with the live-action Superboy TV series that year). Veteran comic book writer Marv Wolfman was the head story editor, and comic book artist Gil Kane provided character designs.

Format
The series was the third animated Superman series (after the Filmation-produced The New Adventures of Superman). While its characterization was in keeping with previous licensed incarnations of Superman characters (e.g. Superman had powers from infancy, Superman had an indestructible cape, and Lex Luthor referred to himself as a "criminal scientist") the series was notable for introducing Marv Wolfman's conception of Lex Luthor into animation. In the first episode, Luthor was portrayed as a billionaire possessing a ring fashioned with a kryptonite stone, which he used to keep Superman from apprehending him. Wolfman blended characteristics of his recent comic-book revamp of Luthor with Gene Hackman's portrayal of the character in live-action films.

Other characters included Cybron (a time traveling conqueror composed of energy) and an appearance by Wonder Woman, in her first non-print appearance since the final season of Super Friends.

Classic characters included Jimmy Olsen, bow-tied in appearance, and Perry White. Lois Lane maintained her identity as an assertive woman with initiative, both in style and business attitude, although her dress and hairstyle were more reflective of the 1980s. A new character to the series, inspired by Miss Tessmacher of the live-action Superman movie from 1978, was Jessica Morganberry who appeared to be the ditzy blonde live-in girlfriend of Lex Luthor with whom he fully confided his schemes.

Superman/Clark Kent was voiced by Beau Weaver, who would later go on to voice Mister Fantastic in the 1994 Marvel animated series Fantastic Four.

The "Superman Family Album"
The final four minutes of each Superman episode were devoted to a brief snapshot from the "Superman Family Album". In addition to "super-baby" misadventures in the early episodes, the segments featured rites of passage such as Clark Kent's first day at school, an overnight scouting campout, getting a driver's license, his first date, graduation from high school, and ultimately his premiere as Superman. The initial idea for the segments was proposed by Judy Price, then head of the CBS Kids division.

Cast
 Beau Weaver – Superman/Kal-El/Clark Kent
 Ginny McSwain – Lois Lane, Jenet Klyburn (in "Fugitive from Space"), Ursa (in "The Hunter"), Faora (in "The Hunter")
 Michael Bell – Lex Luthor, Patron (in "Superman and Wonder Woman vs. the Sorceress of Time")
 Tress MacNeille – Martha Kent
 Alan Oppenheimer – Jonathan Kent
 Stanley Ralph Ross – Perry White, Starrok 
 Lynne Marie Stewart – Jessica Morganberry, Young Clark Kent
 Mark Taylor – Jimmy Olsen
 Bill Woodson – Opening Narration

Additional voices

 Jack Angel – General Hawkins (in "Cybron Strikes")
 René Auberjonois – General Zod (in "The Hunter")
 Brandon Bluhm – Scout Kid (in "Overnight with the Scouts")
 Don Bovinglough – Coach (in "To Play or Not to Play")
 P.L. Brown – (in "Night of the Living Shadows")
 William Callaway – Defendroids (in "Destroy the Defendroids"), (in "The Last Time I Saw Earth")
 Joey Camen – Short Henchman (in "Triple-Play")
 Darleen Carr – 
 Pat Carroll – Queen Hippolyta (in "Superman and Wonder Woman vs. the Sorceress of Time")
 Nancy Cartwright – Melissa (in "At the Babysitter's")
 Cathy Cavadini – Barbara (in "Bonechill"), Co-Ed (in "The Driver's License"), Maria (in "The Driver's License")
 Townsend Coleman – Teenage Clark Kent, Ted Kline
 Christopher Collins – Minotaur (in "Superman and Wonder Woman vs. the Sorceress of Time"), Cyclops (in "Superman and Wonder Woman vs. the Sorceress of Time")
 Danny Cooksey – George (in "The First Day of School")
 Peter Cullen – The Hunter (in "The Hunter")
 Keene Curtis – Bonechill/Chilton Bone (in "Bonechill")
 Gabriel Damon –  (in "Superman and Wonder Woman vs. the Sorceress of Time"), Jessik (in "The Last Time I Saw Earth")
 Victor DiMattia (in "The First Day At School" and "Overnight with the Scouts")
 Shawn Donahue – 
 Jeff Doucette – Sideshow Barker (in "The Circus")
 Jeannie Elias – Mrs. Murphy (in "The Supermarket")
 Ron Feinberg – (in "Night of the Living Shadows", "The Last Time I Saw Earth")
 Ben Ryan Ganger – Scout Kid (in "Overnight with the Scouts")
 Linda Gary – (in "Graduation")
 Liz Georges – Teenage Lana Lang
 Ellen Gerstell – Madame Nikua (in "By the Skin of the Dragon's Teeth")
 Ed Gilbert – Shuttle Captain (in ""The Last Time I Saw Earth")
 Dan Gilvezan – Dr. Morpheus (in "The Beast Beneath These Streets")
 Barry Gordon –  (in "The Driver's License")
 Patrick Gorman – Ship Computer (in "Fugitive from Space")
 Edan Gross – Scout Kid (in "Overnight with the Scouts")
 Kenneth Hartman – 
 Darryl Hickman – (in "The Last Time I Saw Earth")
 Jerry Houser – (in "To Play or Not to Play")
 Dennis Howard – (in "Wildsharkk")
 Erv Immerman – (in "Night of the Living Shadows")
 Danny Mann – (in "Bonechill")
 Kellie Martin – Young Lana Lang (in "The Birthday Party")
 Ron Masak – (in "Wildsharkk")
 Mary McDonald-Lewis – Wonder Woman (in "Superman and Wonder Woman vs. the Sorceress of Time")
 Cindy McGee – (in "Graduation")
 Howard Morris – Prankster/Oswald Loomis (in "Triple-Play")
 Ron Palillo – (in "Night of the Living Shadows")
 Diane Pershing – Anne White (in "Wildsharkk")
 Pat Pinney – Scout Leader (in "Overnight with the Scouts")
 Henry Polic II – Captain Wildsharkk (in "Wildsharkk")
 Hal Rayle – (in "The Big Scoop", "The Last Time I Saw Earth")
 Kathy Ritter –  (in "Bonechill")
 Jennifer Roach – 
 Stu Rosen – Catcher Henchman (in "Triple-Play")
 Neil Ross – S.T.A.R. Labs Security Guard (in "Fugitive from Space")
 Will Ryan – Conroy (in "The Adoption")
 Susan Silo – Xelandra (in "Fugitive from Space")
 John Stephenson – Driving Instructor (in "The Driver's License")
 Carl Steven –
 Lynne Marie Stewart – (in "The Big Scoop", "Graduation")
 Andre Stojka – Professor Gerber (in "Bonechill"), Bowling Alley Manager (in "Bonechill")
 Cree Summer – Barbara (in "Bonechill"), Astronaut (in "The Last Time I Saw Earth")
 Eric Suter –  (in "Bonechill")
 Russi Taylor – Young Lana Lang (in "The First Day of School")
 B.J. Ward – Syrene (in "Superman and Wonder Woman vs. the Sorceress of Time")
 Frank Welker – Cybron (in "Cybron Strikes")
 Tom Williams – Judge Cook (in "Triple-Play")
 Stan Wojno – Fat Henchman (in "Triple-Play")
 Patric Zimmerman – (in "Bonechill")

Crew
 Ginny McSwain – Voice Director
 Lynne Batchelor – Talent Coordinator

Ties to other Superman adaptations
The series is also of note due to its use of re-orchestrated versions of John Williams' classic themes from 1978's Superman: The Movie, as well as an opening sequence that delivered the same narration as the 1950s Adventures of Superman television series (but by the narrator from Super Friends).

Home media

Warner Home Video, DC Comics and Warner Bros. Family Entertainment released the series as a 2-disc set on November 3, 2009.

Episodes

References

External links
 .
 .
 Superman Homepage – episode guide and screenshots

1988 American television series debuts
1988 American television series endings
1980s American science fiction television series
Animated Superman television series
1980s American animated television series
CBS original programming
Ruby-Spears superheroes
Animated television shows based on DC Comics
Television series by Ruby-Spears
Television series by Warner Bros. Television Studios
Television series set in 1988
Television series set in the 4th millennium
English-language television shows
American children's animated action television series
American children's animated adventure television series
American children's animated science fantasy television series
American children's animated superhero television series